Blicavs (pronounced Blitzavs) is a surname of Latvian descent, common to a well-known sporting family of Australia.

People with the surname
 Andris Blicavs (born 1954), retired Australian basketball player
 Ilze Blicavs (m. Nagy), retired Australian basketball player
 Karen Ogden (m. Blicavs), retired Australian basketball player
 Mark Blicavs (born 1991), current Australian rules footballer
 Sara Blicavs (born 1993), current Australian basketball player
 Stephanie Blicavs (nee Cumming - born 1990), current Australian basketball player

References